Uhrenkopf is a mountain of Landkreis Waldeck-Frankenberg, Hesse, Germany.

Mountains of Hesse